Arthur Herbert Procter VC (11 August 1890 – 27 January 1973) was an English recipient of the Victoria Cross, the highest and most prestigious award for gallantry in the face of the enemy that can be awarded to British and Commonwealth forces.

Early life and family 
He was born in 1890, son of Arthur Richard Procter and his wife Ellen Cumpsty.  He was educated at schools in Port Sunlight and Exeter.  Beginning employment at Liverpool Corn Exchange, he was a clerk in the provision trade from 1904 until 1914, when in November he enlisted in the King's Liverpool Regiment after the outbreak of the First World War.

In 1917 Procter married Hilda Codd in Birkenhead. The couple had three sons.

Award 
He was 25 years old, and a private in the 1/5th Battalion, the King's Regiment (Liverpool) (part of the 55th (West Lancashire) Division, British Army during the First World War when the following deed took place for which he was awarded the VC.

On 4 June 1916 near Ficheux, France, Private Procter noticed some movement on the part of two wounded men who were lying in full view of the enemy about 15 yards in front of the trenches. He at once went out on his own initiative and, although heavily fired at, ran and crawled to the two men, got them under cover of a small bank dressed their wounds and promised that they would be rescued after dark. He left them with warm clothing and then returned to the trenches, again being heavily fired at. The men were rescued at dusk.

Procter was the first British soldier to be decorated with the VC on the battlefield.

Further information 
After demobilisation in 1918, he returned to the provision trade where he worked as a salesman until 1926, when he took up full-time study for Church of England ministry at St Aidan's College, Birkenhead.

He was ordained a deacon in 1927 and priest in 1928, while serving a curacy at St Mary's, Prescot, Lancashire.  From 1931 to 1933 he was Vicar of Bosley, and of St Stephen's, Flowery Field, Hyde, (both then in Cheshire) from 1933 to 1944.

In the Second World War he served as a chaplain in the Royal Air Force from 1941 to 1946.

After the war he was successively Rector of St Mary, Droylsden, Manchester, from 1946 to 1951; Vicar of Claybrooke with Wibtoft, Leicestershire from 1951 to 1963, and of Bradworthy, Devon from 1963 to 1964. After retiring from full-time ministry, he lived in the later 1960s at Shrewsbury, Shropshire, where he was chaplain to the town's British Legion branch and in 1966 he was one of seven winners of the VC who were invited by the Minister of Defence to attend the 50th anniversary Battle of the Somme celebrations in France. He later moved to Sheffield.

He died on 27 January 1973, aged 82, in Sheffield.  He was cremated at Sheffield Crematorium in City Road and his ashes buried in All Saints Chapel at Sheffield Cathedral.

Legacy 

Blue plaques have been erected to him by Tameside Metropolitan Borough Council at St Mary's Church, Droylsden, and St Stephen's Church, Hyde.

His Victoria Cross is displayed at the Museum of the King's Regiment, Liverpool, England.

See also

References

External links
Location of grave and VC medal (South Yorkshire)
Liverpool VCs (James Murphy, Pen and Sword Books, 2008)

Regimenal Bio

1890 births
1973 deaths
People from Bootle
British World War I recipients of the Victoria Cross
King's Regiment (Liverpool) soldiers
World War II chaplains
British Army personnel of World War I
Royal Air Force personnel of World War II
20th-century English Anglican priests
Royal Air Force chaplains
British Army recipients of the Victoria Cross
Alumni of St Aidans College Birkenhead
Military personnel from Lancashire